Wibbly Pig is the title character of a series of picture books for young children, written and illustrated by English author and illustrator Mick Inkpen.  The series includes titles such as Wibbly Pig Likes Bananas and Is It Bedtime Wibbly Pig?.  Like Inkpen's Kipper the Dog for slightly older readers, Wibbly Pig has been published internationally and has sold millions of copies worldwide.

The series are generally published as "board books", books with thick cardboard pages which are easier for very young children to turn and also more durable and easier to clean than normal books.  Some of the Wibbly Pig books also have activity features such as flaps which can be lifted to reveal additional art.

Wibbly Pig is a favourite of pre-school children and an ideal introduction to simple ideas through intelligent yet basic text and questions.

Wibbly Pig is often accompanied by his favourite toys Pigley, Flop and Dimple. He carries a bunch of his friends he calls the "Fligley Imple".

Besides the books, Wibbly Pig has been made into other merchandise as well, such as stuffed toys.  A boxed-set version of Is It Bedtime Wibbly Pig? exists which includes a small beanie-style Wibbly.

Wibbly Pig is very similar to Arnold, the young pig friend of Inkpen's Kipper the Dog.  It is possible that they represent the same character.

Like Kipper, Wibbly Pig also exists in the form of a life-sized costumed character who can greet and interact with children at special events such as library story hours.

Television series

Wibbly Pig is an animated children's television series by Wish Films and 9 Story Entertainment. The TV series was broadcast on CBeebies weekdays at 3:30pm (except Wednesdays) from Monday 7 September 2009. On 2 January 2012, it was announced on PBS Kids Sprout. The new series premiered on Sprout with the new season of The Good Night Show, on August 27, and it featured the characters redubbed with Canadian voice actors. It aired on Qubo from January 1, 2018 to February 26, 2021, with the original British voice cast instead of the Canadian one. In Canada, the series aired on TVOKids and Knowledge Kids.

Wibbly Pig is voiced by Liam Tully in Canada and by Macaulay Keeper in the UK, while Zoe Fraser is the voice of the narrator. Spotty Pig, Twin Pig 1, and Twin Pig 2 are voiced by Jacob Ewaniuk. Also, in the UK, most adult voices are by Yvette-Rosette Duncan, while others are provided by Teresa Gallegher.

A Welsh language version, titled 'Wibli Sochyn y Mochyn' was broadcast on S4C

References

 "Wibbly Pig to meet young fans", Coventry Evening Telegraph of March 19, 2004
 "Saying Much with Few (or No) Words", Boston Globe of August 20, 2000

External links
 Series capsule review
 Tickly Christmas Wibbly Pig review
 Wibbly Pig TV series info
 

British picture books
2009 British television series debuts
2010 British television series endings
2000s British animated television series
2010s British animated television series
2009 Canadian television series debuts
2010 Canadian television series endings
2000s Canadian animated television series
2010s Canadian animated television series
Animated television series about children
Animated television series about pigs
British children's animated comedy television series
British television shows based on children's books
British preschool education television series
Canadian children's animated comedy television series
Canadian television shows based on children's books
Canadian preschool education television series
Animated preschool education television series
2000s preschool education television series
2010s preschool education television series
Television series by 9 Story Media Group
TVO original programming
Series of children's books
CBeebies
English-language television shows